Villa Riviera (ital. beach) is a registered historic building on Ocean Boulevard in the Alamitos Beach neighborhood of Long Beach, California, United States.  From the time of its completion in 1929 through the mid-1950s, it was the second-tallest building, and the tallest private building, in Southern California.  The 16-story Châteauesque building has been called the city's "most elegant landmark" and a building that "has helped define the city."  The building was added to the National Register of Historic Places in 1996 and is currently used as condominiums with approximately 134 units, including two penthouse apartments occupying the 16th floor of the building, complete with gargoyles adorning both sides of the bay windows overlooking the city and ocean.

Description and architecture

Built from 1927 to 1929 at a cost of $2.75 million, the Villa Riviera is a 16-story French Gothic Building.  The structure is topped with a steeply pitched verdigris copper roof.  The building was designed by architect Richard King who won a grand prize at an international contest for the design that he referred to as "Tudor Gothic."  The structure features fierce-looking gargoyles perched along the ridges of the higher floors.  The building was also equipped with luxurious features, including a ballroom, Italianate roof garden, lounges, high-speed elevators, "vacuum-type heating," and a 100-car garage.

The Villa Riviera was originally built as a luxury residential cooperative.  The 1928 promotional brochure for the building noted:

When the Villa Riviera was completed, the 277-foot high structure was the second tallest in the region—surpassed only by Los Angeles City Hall.  Until the 1950s, it remained the second-tallest building in Southern California and "the tallest private building in Southern California."

History

Shortly after the Villa Riviera opened, the Great Depression hit, and the demand for luxury cooperative apartments declined.  Also, the first tenants reportedly "didn't see eye-to-eye and the building subsequently was sold and turned into an apartment-hotel."

In 1933, the high-rise Villa Riviera was shaken violently in the Long Beach earthquake but did not sustain structural damage.  A newspaper account described the reaction of the Villa Riviera occupants to the earthquake as follows:

The Villa Riviera, a 16-story apartment hotel, where most of the high-ranking officers of the Navy reside, swayed violently but suffered no more than a few cracks and fallen plaster. Admiral Richard H. Leigh, commander-in-chief of the United States fleet, after rushing down the stairway with most of the other 400 occupants and out into the street, returned to his suite around midnight in disdain of the succeeding shocks, which continued through the night. George Kingreet, assistant manager of the Villa Riviera, painted a picture of the hurried exit of the naval notables when the first shock came. 'The elevator stopped and everybody rushed down the stairs and out into the street. The bellboy stuck right on the job and went through the rooms, clearing them of people.'

In 1937, silent film star Norma Talmadge and her ex-husband Joseph M. Schenck, president of 20th Century Fox, bought the building for $1.5 million.  The Los Angeles Times reported that "the deal was one of the largest realty transactions in Southern California in several years."  Talmadge lived in the penthouse for a time.

During World War II, several U.S. Navy officers lived at the Villa Riviera.  The turret-like tower atop the building was used by the Navy to spot enemy ships off the Southern California coast.

In the 1940s and early 1950s, the Villa Riviera was known as the "Home of Admirals" due to its being the home of many of the senior officers of the United States Pacific Fleet.  In 1955, the building was purchased by the Morris Hotel chain for $1.75 million.  Within months, the new owner converted the building to its original use as a residential "own-your-own" cooperative building.  Despite the conversion, the owners kept the hotel's cocktail lounge, beauty salon, coffee shop, dining room and valet service for the convenience of the cooperative residents.

The first Miss Universe Pageant was held at the Villa Riviera in 1952. Marine Corps and Navy officers acted as escorts, one for each contestant.

A newspaper feature in 1965 reported that apartments at the Villa Riviera sold "for anywhere from $10,000 to $40,000 according to size."  In 1969, Long Beach residents were surprised to learn that the City had condemned the Villa Riviera as a fire hazard.  After the violations were corrected, the building emerged from the condemnation in 1971.

In 1991, the building was converted to condominiums.   In 1996, the building was added to the National Register of Historic Places.  In 2003, the Los Angeles Times called it "Long Beach's most elegant landmark," a building that "has helped define the city for nearly three-quarters of a century."

In 2007 and 2008, the Homeowners Association conducted a $4 million facelift that included restoration of certain historical elements, including replacement of six of the original gargoyles that had been removed.

See also
 List of City of Long Beach Historic Landmarks
 National Register of Historic Places listings in Los Angeles County, California

References

External links
 Villa Riviera History
 Image of Villa Riviera, Long Beach, [1930s]. Los Angeles Times Photographic Archive (Collection 1429). UCLA Library Special Collections, Charles E. Young Research Library, University of California, Los Angeles.

Residential buildings on the National Register of Historic Places in California
Residential skyscrapers in California
Skyscrapers in Long Beach, California
Residential buildings completed in 1929
Gothic Revival architecture in California
Landmarks in Long Beach, California
Buildings and structures on the National Register of Historic Places in Los Angeles County, California
1929 establishments in California